Galloisiana kosuensis is a species of cave-dwelling insect in the family Grylloblattidae. Its type locality is Gosu Cave, South Korea.

References

Grylloblattidae
Insects of Korea
Cave insects